The 1978–79 NBA season was the 9th season of the team formerly known as the Buffalo Braves in the NBA. They had moved from Buffalo, New York to San Diego, California and rechristened themselves as the San Diego Clippers.

Draft picks

Roster
{| class="toccolours" style="font-size: 95%; width: 100%;"
|-
! colspan="2" style="background-color: #87CEEB;  color: #FF8C00; text-align: center;" | San Diego Clippers roster
|- style="background-color: #FF8C00; color: #87CEEB;   text-align: center;"
! Players !! Coaches
|-
| valign="top" |
{|class="sortable" style="background:transparent; margin:0px; width:100%;"
! Pos. !! # !! Nat. !! Name !! Ht. !! Wt. !! From
|-

Roster notes
 This was Kevin Kunnert's second stint with the franchise; he previously played for the Buffalo Braves in 1973–74.

Regular season

Game log 

|-  style="text-align:center; background:#fbb;"
| 1 || October 13 || @ Suns || L 114–128 || Kermit Washington (25) || Kermit Washington (11)|| Randy Smith (11) || Arizona Veterans Memorial Coliseum  11,217 || 0–1 || 
|-  style="text-align:center; background:#fbb;"
| 2 || October 14 || @ Warriors || L 89–117 || Tied (21) || Kermit Washington (14)|| Randy Smith (7) || Oakland-Alameda County Coliseum Arena  10,254 || 0–2 || 
|-  style="text-align:center; background:#fbb;"
| 3 || October 15 || Nuggets || L 94–98|| Randy Smith (28) || Swen Nater (12)|| Lloyd Free (4) || San Diego Sports Arena  8,362 || 0–3 || 
|-  style="text-align:center; background:#bfb;"
| 4 || October 17 || Bulls || W 99–94 || Lloyd Free (29) || Tied (14)|| Tied (4) || San Diego Sports Arena  4,944 || 1–3 || 
|-  style="text-align:center; background:#fbb;"
| 5 || October 18 || Spurs || L 125–127 || Lloyd Free (29) || Kermit Washington (16)|| Lloyd Free (8) || San Diego Sports Arena  5,614 || 1–4 || 
|-  style="text-align:center; background:#bfb;"
| 6 || October 20 || @ Bulls || W 110–94 || Nick Weatherspoon (19) || Kermit Washington (13)|| World B. Free (9) || Chicago Stadium  12,412 || 2–4 || 
|-  style="text-align:center; background:#fbb;"
| 7 || October 21 || @ Pacers || L 119–125 || Lloyd Free (35) || Tied (12)|| Lloyd Free (6) || Market Square Arena  9,243 || 2–5 || 
|-  style="text-align:center; background:#bfb;"
| 8 || October 24 || Lakers || W 124–123 || Lloyd Free (35) || Kevin Kunnert (9)|| Lloyd Free (7) || San Diego Sports Arena  11,637 || 3–5 || 
|-  style="text-align:center; background:#bfb;"
| 9 || October 25 || Bucks || W 125–116 || Lloyd Free (38) || Swen Nater (15)|| Lloyd Free (9) || San Diego Sports Arena  8,051 || 4–5 || 
|-  style="text-align:center; background:#fbb;"
| 10 || October 27 || @ Lakers || L 101–113 || Lloyd Free (26) || Swen Nater (10)|| Lloyd Free (5) || The Forum  9,246 || 4–6 || 
|-  style="text-align:center; background:#bfb;"
| 11 || October 29|| SuperSonics || W 103–100 || Randy Smith (26) || Kevin Kunnert (10)|| Randy Smith (6) || San Diego Sports Arena  9,469 || 5–6 || 
|-

|-  style="text-align:center; background:#fbb;"
| 12 || November 2 || Knicks || L 122–127 || Lloyd Free (42) || Kermit Washington (10)|| Lloyd Free (7) || San Diego Sports Arena  9,744 || 5–7 || 
|-  style="text-align:center; background:#fbb;"
| 13 || November 3 || @ Trail Blazers || L 98–119 || Randy Smith (22) || Kermit Washington (11)|| Randy Smith (4) || Memorial Coliseum  12,666 || 5–8 || 
|-  style="text-align:center; background:#fbb;"
| 14 || November 4 || Cavaliers || L 106–112 || Lloyd Free (24) || Kermit Washington (14)|| Lloyd Free (6) || San Diego Sports Arena  9,791 || 5–9 || 
|-  style="text-align:center; background:#bfb;"
| 15 || November 7 || @ Jazz || W 121–115 || Lloyd Free (29) || Nick Weatherspoon (16)|| Lloyd Free (6) || New Orleans Superdome  6,411 || 6–9 || 
|-  style="text-align:center; background:#fbb;"
| 16 || November 8 || @ Spurs || L 125–163 || Lloyd Free (26) || Swen Nater (9)|| Tied (5) || HemisFair Arena  11,358 || 6–10 || 
|-  style="text-align:center; background:#fbb;"
| 17 || November 9 || @ Hawks || L 101–125 || Nick Weatherspoon (25) || Swen Nater (10)|| Tied (4) || Omni Coliseum  5,082 || 6–11 || 
|-  style="text-align:center; background:#fbb;"
| 18 || November 11 || @ Rockets || L 123–136 || Lloyd Free (31) || Tied (6)|| Randy Smith (11) || The Summit  9,179 || 6–12 || 
|-  style="text-align:center; background:#bfb;"
| 19 || November 14 || Pacers || W 109–106 || Kermit Washington (29) || Swen Nater (12)|| Lloyd Free (5) || San Diego Sports Arena  6,381 || 7–12 || 
|-  style="text-align:center; background:#bfb;"
| 20 || November 16 || Warriors || W 112–109 || Lloyd Free (29) || Kermit Washington (10)|| Lloyd Free (5) || San Diego Sports Arena  8,483 || 8–12 || 
|-  style="text-align:center; background:#bfb;"
| 21 || November 18 || Jazz || W 114–111 || Randy Smith (36) || Swen Nater (17)|| Randy Smith (6) || San Diego Sports Arena  8,151 || 9–12 || 
|-  style="text-align:center; background:#fbb;"
| 22 || November 21 || Hawks || L 107–113 || Lloyd Free (26) || Kevin Kunnert (13)|| Lloyd Free (6) || San Diego Sports Arena  6,730 || 9–13 || 
|-  style="text-align:center; background:#fbb;"
| 23 || November 24 || @ 76ers || L 120–134 || Lloyd Free (33) || Kermit Washington (11)|| Lloyd Free (8) || The Spectrum  18,276 || 9–14 || 
|-  style="text-align:center; background:#bfb;"
| 24 || November 25 || @ Kings || W 87–86 || Lloyd Free (28) || Kevin Kunnert (15)|| Tied (4) || Kemper Arena  11,320 || 10–14 || 
|-  style="text-align:center; background:#bfb;"
| 25 || November 26 || Celtics || W 105–103 || LLoyd Free (28) || Kermit Washington (9)|| Randy Smith (7) || San Diego Sports Arena  7,042 || 11–14 || 
|-  style="text-align:center; background:#fbb;"
| 26 || November 30 || Rockets || L 104–113 || Nick Weatherspoon (22) || Nick Weatherspoon (11)|| Randy Smith (7) || San Diego Sports Arena  6,597 || 11–15 || 
|-

|-  style="text-align:center; background:#fbb;"
| 27 || December 2 || Pistons || L 113–120 || Tied (25) || Tied (13)|| Randy Smith (9) || San Diego Sports Arena  6,433 || 11–16 || 
|-  style="text-align:center; background:#fbb;"
| 28 || December 6 || @ Celtics || L 111–117 || Lloyd Free (25) || Tied (11)|| Randy Smith (10) || Boston Garden  7,688 || 11–17 || 
|-  style="text-align:center; background:#fbb;"
| 29 || December 9 || @ Nets || L 120–125 || Lloyd Free (38) || Swen Nater (10)|| Lloyd Free (4) || Rutgers Athletic Center  4,286 || 11–18 || 
|-  style="text-align:center; background:#bfb;"
| 30 || December 10 || @ Bucks || W 107–106 || Lloyd Free (28) || Tied (12)|| Lloyd Free (5) || MECCA Arena  10,889 || 12–18 || 
|-  style="text-align:center; background:#bfb;"
| 31 || December 12 || @ Knicks || W 105–103 || Randy Smith (28) || Tied (9)|| Lloyd Free (8) || Madison Square Garden  11,981 || 13–18 || 
|-  style="text-align:center; background:#fbb;"
| 32 || December 13 || @ Bullets || L 117–134 || Randy Smith (29) || Swen Nater (9)|| Randy Smith (6) || Capital Centre  7,621 || 13–19 || 
|-  style="text-align:center; background:#bfb;"
| 33 || December 17 || Suns || W 116–100 || Lloyd Free (30) || Swen Nater (13)|| Randy Smith (5) || San Diego Sports Arena  6,068 || 14–19 || 
|-  style="text-align:center; background:#fbb;"
| 34 || December 19 || 76ers || L 113–124 || Lloyd Free (35) || Swen Nater (10) || Swen Nater (3) || San Diego Sports Arena  13,822 || 14–20 || 
|-  style="text-align:center; background:#bfb;"
| 35 || December 25 || @ SuperSonics || W 123–118 || Randy Smith (29) || Swen Nater (13) || Randy Smith (12) || Kingdome  11,910 || 15–20 || 
|-  style="text-align:center; background:#bfb;"
| 36 || December 26 || Bulls || W 115–109 || Lloyd Free (36) || Kermit Washington (10) || Lloyd Free (5) || San Diego Sports Arena  8,582 || 16–20 || 
|-  style="text-align:center; background:#fbb;"
| 37 || December 28 || @ Cavaliers || L 114–116 || Lloyd Free (36) || Kevin Kunnert (9) || Lloyd Free (6) || Richfield Coliseum  11,091 || 16–21 || 
|-  style="text-align:center; background:#bfb;"
| 38 || December 29 || @ Pistons || W 111–107 || Lloyd Free (35) || Swen Nater (14) || Randy Smith (8) || Pontiac Silverdome  10,284 || 17–21 || 
|-  style="text-align:center; background:#bfb;"
| 39 || December 30 || @ Pacers || W 114–111 || Lloyd Free (30) || Kevin Kunnert (13) || Sidney Wicks (6) || Market Square Arena  7,263 || 18–21 || 
|-

|-  style="text-align:center; background:#bfb;"
| 40 || January 2 || Pistons || W 137–119 || Lloyd Free (33) || Kermit Washington (17) || Kermit Washington (5) || San Diego Sports Arena  6,139 || 19–21 || 
|-  style="text-align:center; background:#fbb;"
| 41 || January 4 || @ Kings || L 99–108 || Randy Smith (37) || Kermit Washington (15) || Randy Smith (3) || Kemper Arena  6,647 || 19–22 || 
|-  style="text-align:center; background:#fbb;"
| 42 || January 6 || @ Bucks || L 93–104 || Freeman Williams (26) || Kermit Washington (14) || Randy Smith (6) || MECCA Arena  10,938 || 19–23 || 
|-  style="text-align:center; background:#bfb;"
| 43 || January 9 || @ Jazz || W 114–107 || Lloyd Free (34) || Kermit Washington (10) || Tied (7) || New Orleans Superdome  6,342 || 20–23 || 
|-  style="text-align:center; background:#fbb;"
| 44 || January 11 || @ Spurs || L 111–140 || Nick Weatherspoon (38) || Nick Weatherspoon (9) || Randy Smith (12) || HemisFair Arena  11,008 || 20–24 || 
|-  style="text-align:center; background:#fbb;"
| 45 || January 13 || @ Hawks || L 119–124 || Lloyd Free (46) || Kermit Washington (17) || Tied (3) || Omni Coliseum  7,681 || 20–25 || 
|-  style="text-align:center; background:#fbb;"
| 46 || January 14 || @ Bullets || L 91–125 || Randy Smith (24) || Kermit Washington (13) || Randy Smith (8) || Capital Centre  9,588 || 20–26 || 
|-  style="text-align:center; background:#bfb;"
| 47 || January 17 || Lakers || W 119–117 || Lloyd Free (31) || Tied (11) || Tied (4) || San Diego Sports Arena  13,073 || 21–26 || 
|-  style="text-align:center; background:#bfb;"
| 48 || January 24 || Trail Blazers || W 122–121 || Lloyd Free (35) || Nick Weatherspoon (11) || Lloyd Free (5) || San Diego Sports Arena  9,659 || 22–26 || 
|-  style="text-align:center; background:#bfb;"
| 49 || January 26 || @ Bulls || W 107–91 || Lloyd Free (28) || Swen Nater (15) || Tied (5) || Chicago Stadium  8,523 || 23–26 || 
|-  style="text-align:center; background:#bfb;"
| 50 || January 27 || @ Cavaliers || W 111–110 || Lloyd Free (38) || Kermit Washington (15) || Lloyd Free (4) || Richfield Coliseum  10,523 || 24–26 || 
|-  style="text-align:center; background:#fbb;"
| 51 || January 28 || @ Pistons || L 118–128 || Lloyd Free (23) || Swen Nater (10) || Sidney Wicks (6) || Pontiac Silverdome  9,279 || 24–27 || 
|-  style="text-align:center; background:#bfb;"
| 52 || January 30 || Bucks || W 117–113 || Randy Smith (26) || Kevin Kunnert (14) || Tied (7) || San Diego Sports Arena  8,431 || 25–27 || 
|-  style="text-align:center; background:#bfb;"
| 53 || January 31 || Nets || W 112–104 || Lloyd Free (25) || Kermit Washington (14) || Randy Smith (6) || San Diego Sports Arena  7,227 || 26–27 || 
|-

|-  style="text-align:center; background:#bfb;"
| 54 || February 2 || Nuggets || W 124–100 || Lloyd Free (49) || Kevin Kunnert (12) || Randy Smith (5) || San Diego Sports Arena  11,763 || 27–28 || 
|-  style="text-align:center; background:#fbb;"
| 55 || February 7 || Spurs || L 113–126 || Lloyd Free (25) || Kermit Washington (10) || Tied (4) || San Diego Sports Arena  8,498 || 27–28 || 
|-  style="text-align:center; background:#fbb;"
| 56 || February 9 || @ 76ers || L 106–117 || Randy Smith (25) || Nick Weatherspoon (13) || Nick Weatherspoon (5) || The Spectrum  15,823 || 27–29 || 
|-  style="text-align:center; background:#fbb;"
| 57 || February 11 || @ Nets || L 98–104 || Lloyd Free (22) || Swen Nater (18) || Lloyd Free (6) || Rutgers Athletic Center  14,749 || 27–30 || 
|-  style="text-align:center; background:#fbb;"
| 58 || February 13 || Bullets || L 136–138  2OT || Lloyd Free (45) || Nick Weatherspoon (10) || Lloyd Free (4) || San Diego Sports Arena  8,111 || 27–31 || 
|-  style="text-align:center; background:#bfb;"
| 59 || February 15 || Jazz || W 122–112 || Lloyd Free (30) || Swen Nater (10) || Randy Smith (5) || San Diego Sports Arena  5,827 || 28–31 || 
|-  style="text-align:center; background:#bfb;"
| 60 || February 16 || @ Nuggets || W 118–104 || Randy Smith (25) || Kermit Washington (14) || Tied (5) || McNichols Sports Arena  15,119 || 29–31 || 
|-  style="text-align:center; background:#bfb;"
| 61 || February 18 || Hawks || W 116–101 || Lloyd Free (26) || Sidney Wicks (13) || Randy Smith (4) || San Diego Sports Arena  6,959 || 30–31 || 
|-  style="text-align:center; background:#bfb;"
| 62 || February 23 || 76ers || W 117–116 || Lloyd Free (26) || Swen Nater (10) || Tied (3) || San Diego Sports Arena  13,783 || 31–31 || 
|-  style="text-align:center; background:#bfb;"
| 63 || February 25 || Celtics || W 131–116 || Lloyd Free (38) || Kevin Kunnert (10) || Tied (6) || San Diego Sports Arena  10,671 || 32–31 || 
|-  style="text-align:center; background:#bfb;"
| 64 || February 27 || Pacers || W 124–107 || Lloyd Free (28) || Tied (9) || Kermit Washington (6) || San Diego Sports Arena  6,156 || 33–31 || 
|-  style="text-align:center; background:#bfb;"
| 65 || February 28 || Kings || W 122–120 || Randy Smith (22) || Swen Nater (8) || Randy Smith (7) || San Diego Sports Arena  9,051 || 34–31 || 
|-

|-  style="text-align:center; background:#bfb;"
| 66 || March 2 || @ Celtics || W 106–99 || Lloyd Free (28) || Kermit Washington (15) || Randy Smith (6) || Boston Garden  14,345 || 35–31 || 
|-  style="text-align:center; background:#fbb;"
| 67 || March 3 || @ Knicks || L 108–111 || Lloyd Free (34) || Kevin Kunnert (23) || Tied (6) || Madison Square Garden  11,488 || 35–32 || 
|-  style="text-align:center; background:#bfb;"
| 68 || March 7 || Rockets || W 138–115 || Lloyd Free (34) || Swen Nater (10) || Tied (5) || San Diego Sports Arena  19,911 || 36–32 || 
|-  style="text-align:center; background:#bfb;"
| 69 || March 10 || Cavaliers || W 121–115 || Lloyd Free (33) || Swen Nater (12) || Tied (3) || San Diego Sports Arena  13,783 || 37–32 || 
|-  style="text-align:center; background:#bfb;"
| 70 || March 14 || Trail Blazers || W 110–105 || Lloyd Free (29) || Kevin Kunnert (12) || Randy Smith (9) || San Diego Sports Arena  13,401 || 38–32 || 
|-  style="text-align:center; background:#bfb;"
| 71 || March 17 || Warriors || W 106–103 || Lloyd Free (23) || Kevin Kunnert (11) || Tied (4) || San Diego Sports Arena  11,332 || 39–32 || 
|-  style="text-align:center; background:#bfb;"
| 72 || March 18 || Nets || W 110–98 || Lloyd Free (31) || Nick Weatherspoon (17) || Randy Smith (5) || San Diego Sports Arena  18,538 || 40–32 || 
|-  style="text-align:center; background:#fbb;"
| 73 || March 20 || @ Trail Blazers || L 109–115 || Randy Smith (28) || Swen Nater (12) || Randy Smith (12) || Memorial Coliseum  12,666 || 40–33 || 
|-  style="text-align:center; background:#bfb;"
| 74 || March 21 || @ Warriors || W 106–103 || Lloyd Free (35) || Kevin Kunnert (17) || Tied (5) || Oakland-Alameda County Coliseum Arena  7,813 || 41–33 || 
|-  style="text-align:center; background:#fbb;"
| 75 || March 23 || @ Lakers || L 119–156 || Randy Smith (33) || Kermit Washington (17) || Kermit Washington (6) || The Forum  14,212 || 41–34 || 
|-  style="text-align:center; background:#fbb;"
| 76 || March 27 || @ SuperSonics || L 109–115 || Lloyd Free (28) || Tied (9) || Lloyd Free (4) || Kingdome  20,087 || 41–35 || 
|-  style="text-align:center; background:#fbb;"
| 77 || March 29 || Kings || L 111–116 || Lloyd Free (37) || Kermit Washington (15) || Brian Taylor (4) || San Diego Sports Arena  13,189 || 41–36 || 
|-  style="text-align:center; background:#fbb;"
| 78 || March 30 || @ Nuggets || L 121–130 || Lloyd Free (42) || Kevin Kunnert (13) || Lloyd Free (6) || McNichols Sports Arena  17,607 || 41–37 || 
|-

|-  style="text-align:center; background:#bfb;"
| 79 || April 1 || Knicks || W 126–116 || Lloyd Free (28) || Kevin Kunnert (15) || Tied (4) || San Diego Sports Arena  8,371 || 42–37 || 
|-  style="text-align:center; background:#fbb;"
| 80 || April 4 || SuperSonics || L 107–115 || Nick Weatherspoon (25) || Kermit Washington (13) || Randy Smith (5) || San Diego Sports Arena  20,087 || 42–38 || 
|-  style="text-align:center; background:#fbb;"
| 81 || April 6 || @ Suns || L 117–118 || Lloyd Free (29) || Swen Nater (10) || Tied (4) || Arizona Veterans Memorial Coliseum  12,660 || 42–39 || 
|-  style="text-align:center; background:#bfb;"
| 82 || April 7 || Suns || W 120–116 || Lloyd Free (36) || Swen Nater (12) || Brian Taylor (3) || San Diego Sports Arena  11,614 || 43–39 || 
|-

Season standings

Notes
 z, y – division champions
 x – clinched playoff spot

Record vs. opponents

Player stats

Awards and records
 Lloyd Free, All-NBA Second Team

Transactions
The Clippers were involved in the following transactions during the 1978–79 season.

Coaching Change

Trades

Free agents

Additions

Subtractions

References

Los Angeles Clippers seasons
San Diego